"B-B-B-Burnin' Up with Love" is a song co-written and recorded by American country music artist Eddie Rabbitt.  It was released in May 1984 as the first single from the album The Best Year of My Life.  The song reached number 3 on the Billboard Hot Country Singles & Tracks chart.  It was written by Rabbitt, Even Stevens and Billy Joe Walker Jr.

Chart performance

References

1984 singles
Eddie Rabbitt songs
Songs written by Eddie Rabbitt
Warner Records singles
Songs written by Even Stevens (songwriter)
Songs written by Billy Joe Walker Jr.
1984 songs